Borkowice  is a village in Przysucha County, Masovian Voivodeship, in east-central Poland. It is the seat of the gmina (administrative district) called Gmina Borkowice.

The village has a population of 658.

References

Borkowice